Queen Cristina was the name of two steamships operated by Thomas Dunlop & Sons.

, wrecked in 1899 off Lihou Reef in Coral Sea.
, wrecked in 1907 on North Seal Rock off Crescent City.

Ship names